The PM's Daughter is a ten-part Australian political comedy drama television series aimed at children and teenagers. It premiered on ABC Me on 1 January 2022.

Plot
The series follows Cat Parkes Pérez, a teen activist whose life is thrown into disarray when her single mother Isabel is unexpectedly thrust into the role of Prime Minister of Australia. As major disruptions begin to occur at Canberra landmarks designed to directly sabotage the Prime Minister, Cat and her new friends, Sadie and Ollie, set out to track down and unmask a rogue faction within a youth action group called Action Uprising.

Cast
Cassandra Helmot as Cat Parkes Pérez
Natalie English as Sadie
Jaga Yap as Ollie
Nya Cofie as Miro
Amelie James-Power as Georgina
Claire Fearon as Prime Minister Isabel Pérez
Anthony Brandon Wong as Deputy Prime Minister Tim Yeung
Gemma Bird Matheson as Yvette
Renee Lim as Deputy Principal Tan
Maximilian Mulvenney as Jared
Indiana Kwong as Grace
Amelie James Power as Georgina
Lewis Fitz-Gerald as Henry
Cecilia Yeoman as Jacinta
Sebastian Alanis Alvarez as Tom
Dinitha Senevirathne as Eric
Mantshologane Maile as Murphy

Production
The series was filmed in July 2021 in various locations in Sydney and Canberra including Brockby Lodge at 123 Homebush Road, Strathfield, the former home of Harold Arnott (1888-1971) of Arnott's Biscuits fame. The house is used as the exterior location of the Prime Minister of Australia's residence The Lodge. A Victorian style home is used as the interior of the PM’s house.

References

External links 
 

Australian drama television series
Australian Broadcasting Corporation original programming
2020s teen drama television series
2022 Australian television series debuts
Australian comedy-drama television series
Prime Minister of Australia
Television series about teenagers
Television series by Fremantle (company)
Television shows filmed in Australia
Television shows set in Sydney